Paavo Aho (22 December 1891 – 19 April 1918) was a Finnish track and field athlete who competed in the 1912 Summer Olympics. In 1912 he finished sixth in the two handed shot put competition and tenth in the shot put event.

He was born in Helsinki and was executed during the Finnish Civil War, captured while acting as a local White Guard commander in Hamina.

References

External links
list of Finnish athletes

1891 births
1918 deaths
Athletes from Helsinki
People from Uusimaa Province (Grand Duchy of Finland)
Finnish male shot putters
Olympic athletes of Finland
Athletes (track and field) at the 1912 Summer Olympics
People of the Finnish Civil War (White side)
20th-century executions by Finland
19th-century Finnish people
20th-century Finnish people